Antonio Williams (born October 22, 1997) is an American football running back for the BC Lions of the CFL. He played college football at Ohio State and North Carolina.

College career
Williams began his collegiate career at Ohio State. He spent two seasons with the Buckeyes and rushed for 290 yards and three touchdowns as a sophomore while serving as the team's third running back behind J. K. Dobbins and Mike Weber. Williams announced that he would be transferring to North Carolina in the spring of his sophomore year.

Following his transfer, Williams was granted a hardship waiver from the NCAA and was not required to sit out his junior season. He started seven games in his first season with the Tar Heels and finished as the team's second-leading rusher with 504 yards and five touchdowns. As a senior, Williams split carries with Michael Carter and Javonte Williams and rushed for 322 yards and three touchdowns on 48 carries.

Professional career

Buffalo Bills
Williams was signed by the Buffalo Bills as an undrafted free agent on May 8, 2020. He was waived by the Bills on August 5, but re-signed on August 30, 2020. Williams was waived during final roster cuts and was signed to the team's practice squad on September 6 before again being released. Williams was again re-signed to the practice squad on September 23, 2020, and released on October 3 only to return to the unit on October 8. He was elevated to the active roster on January 2, 2021, for the team's Week 17 game against the Miami Dolphins, and reverted to the practice squad after the game. He made his NFL debut in the game, rushing for a team-high 63 yards and two touchdowns on 12 carries while catching a pass for 20 yards in a 56–26 win. He was elevated again on January 15 for the team's divisional playoff game against the Baltimore Ravens, and reverted to the practice squad again following the game. He signed a reserve/futures contract with the Bills on January 26, 2021.

On August 31, 2021, Williams was waived by the Bills and re-signed to the practice squad the next day.

New York Giants
On January 27, 2022, Williams signed a futures contract with the New York Giants.

On September 27, 2022, Williams was waived by the Giants. On September 29, he was re-signed to the practice squad. He was released on October 5.

Personal life
A NASCAR fan since his youth, Williams is an advisor to NASCAR Xfinity Series driver Joe Graf Jr.; the two befriended each other through a mutual acquaintance, and Williams joined Graf's SS-Green Light Racing team prior to the 2021 racing season.

References

External links
Buffalo Bills bio
North Carolina Tar Heels bio

1997 births
Living people
21st-century African-American sportspeople
American football running backs
Players of American football from North Carolina
North Carolina Tar Heels football players
Buffalo Bills players
Ohio State Buckeyes football players
African-American players of American football
New York Giants players
People from Stanly County, North Carolina